Slovakia women's national floorball team is the national team of Slovakia.  At the 2007 Floorball Women's World Championship in Frederikshavn, Denmark, the team finished ninth in the B-Division. At the 2013 Floorball Women's World Championship in Brno and Ostrava, Czech Republic, the team finished ninth. At the 2017 Floorball Women's World Championship in Bratislava, Slovakia, the team finished fifth.

All-time world championships results

World championships results against other teams

References 

Women's national floorball teams
Floorball
Women's national team